Arnold William Knight (30 May 1919 – 8 October 2003) was an English professional footballer who played as a left half and inside left.

Career
Born in Guisborough, Knight played for Tottenham Hotspur, Leeds United, Plymouth Argyle and Bradford City. During his time with Bradford City he made seven appearances in the Football League.

He also guested during the Second World War for Leeds United, Darlington, Aldershot and Queens Park Rangers.

Sources

References

1919 births
2003 deaths
English footballers
Tottenham Hotspur F.C. players
Leeds United F.C. players
Leeds United F.C. wartime guest players
Darlington F.C. wartime guest players
Aldershot F.C. wartime guest players
Queens Park Rangers F.C. wartime guest players
Plymouth Argyle F.C. players
Bradford City A.F.C. players
English Football League players
Association football wing halves
Association football inside forwards